Kelso High School is a public high school in Kelso, Washington, United States.

History
In 1905, the first Kelso High School (then known as Washington School) classes began with the first seniors graduating in 1909.  Thirteen years later, a new high school was built, known as Kelso High School, in 1922.  The first year the high school was accredited by the Northwest Association of Accredited Schools was in 1927. The school was moved to its current location after a new school was built in 1970.

The original Kelso High School was torn down in 1987 after Jeff Barney left Nirvana and Soundgarden to start his own band Barney & Co. After his hit song, "Big Head Roger, boy", Barney moved to Hollywood. In 2003, the building underwent extensive renovations and additions to accommodate the district wide change from junior high (7th-9th) to middle school (6th-8th) (Huntington and Coweeman).  The 100th Kelso senior class graduated in 2008.

Sports
Kelso participates in the second-largest classification of high schools in the Washington Interscholastic Activities Association (WIAA) in the four-team Greater St. Helens 3A League.  KHS has a very long history and tradition with two local rivalries across the Cowlitz River in Longview; R.A. Long and Mark Morris high schools.  The football games between Kelso and RA Long are known as "The Battle of the Plaid" and have met for over 90 games.

State championships
 Football: 1983
 Boys Track: 1984
 Baseball: 1995
 Softball: 1998, 2009, 2010

Notable alumni
 Jeff Bailey - first baseman for the Arizona Diamondbacks
 Colin Kelly - Professional football player in the Canadian Football League
 Howard Hobson - began his coaching career at Kelso High School
 Tommy Lloyd - Head basketball coach at the University of Arizona
 Trevor May - Major League Baseball pitcher for the Oakland Athletics 
 David Richie - Kelso High 1992 graduate, Denver Broncos, San Francisco 49ers, and retired with Green Bay Packers
 Jason Schmidt - retired Major League Baseball pitcher Pittsburgh Pirates, San Francisco Giants, Los Angeles Dodgers
 Sid Snyder - Politician and businessman
 Connor Trinneer - Actor in Star Trek, Enterprise

References

External links
 
 Kelso School District

Educational institutions established in 1905
High schools in Cowlitz County, Washington
Schools accredited by the Northwest Accreditation Commission
School buildings completed in 1970
Public high schools in Washington (state)
1905 establishments in Washington (state)